The following table indicates the party of elected officials in the U.S. state of Minnesota:
Governor
Lieutenant Governor
Secretary of State
Attorney General
State Auditor
State Treasurer (before 2003)

The table also indicates the historical party composition in the:
State Senate
State House of Representatives
State delegation to the United States Senate
State delegation to the United States House of Representatives

For years in which a United States presidential election was held, the table indicates which party's nominees received the state's electoral votes.

Pre-statehood (1849–1857)

1858–2002

2003–present

See also
Politics in Minnesota
Politics of Minnesota
List of political parties in Minnesota

References

Politics of Minnesota
Government of Minnesota
Minnesota
Strength